Michael "Bruno" Lawrence (born 12 April 1990) is a professional rugby league footballer who plays as a  for the Bradford Bulls in the RFL Championship. He is both an England Knights and Jamaican international, and has played as a er and  forward at various stages during his career.

Background
Lawrence was born in Huddersfield, West Yorkshire, England and has Jamaican heritage. Lawrence is a product of the Giants' academy system. and represented the England Knights in the European cup in 2012
In 2019 he enjoyed a well earned Testimonial year. He is a firm favourite amongst the Huddersfield supporters who refer to him as "Bruno", a nickname due to his likeness to the famous British boxer Frank Bruno.

Career
It was announced in July 2007 that Lawrence would become a member Huddersfield's Super League squad for the 2008 season. Lawrence's previous club was Newsome Panthers.
Lawrence was selected for the England Academy team in the 2007 season, a reward for consistently good performances throughout the season with Huddersfield's Academy.
Lawrence made his Super League début during Huddersfield's important fixture with Warrington on 31 August 2007. He started the game on the substitutes' bench and replaced Chris Nero for the last five minutes of the game. This made him the first player born in the 1990s to play super league. Since then Lawrence has enjoyed a trip to the challenge cup final at Wembley in 2009. Been a part of the history making squad that lifted the league leaders shield in 2013, and was granted a year long testimonial in 2019 for Over 10 years loyal service to the Huddersfield Giants club. In 2012, Lawrence was a part of the England Knights team that won the European cup, and again In 2013 when they beat Samoa. In 2019 represented Jamaica in a full international, ironically against the England knights at Leeds.

References

External links

Huddersfield Giants profile
SL profile
Jamaica profile

1990 births
Living people
Bradford Bulls players
England Knights national rugby league team players
English people of Jamaican descent
Jamaican rugby league players
English rugby league players
Huddersfield Giants captains
Huddersfield Giants players
Jamaica national rugby league team players
Rugby league centres
Rugby league locks
Rugby league players from Huddersfield
Rugby league second-rows